This is list of prisons in Nepal.

Province 1
 Bhojpur Jail
 Morang Jail
 Dhankuta jail
  Dolakha Jail
 Ilam Jail
 Jhapa Jail
Jhumka regional prison
 Okhaldhunga Jail
 Panchthar Jail
 Sankhuwasabha Jail
  Solukhumbu Jail
 Taplejung Jail
 Terhathum Jail
 Udayapur Jail

Province 2
  Mahottari Jail
  Parsa Jail
  Rautahat Jail
 Sarlahi Jail
 Saptari Jail
  Siraha Jail
 Sunsari Jail

Bagmati province
 Bhimphedi Jail
Central Jail (Kathmandu)
 Chitwan Jail
 Dhading Jail
 Jagannath Dewal
 Kavrepalanchowk Jail
 Makwanpur Jail
Nakhu Jail (Estd 2007 BS)
 Nuwakot Jail
  Ramechhap Jail
 Rasuwa Jail
  Sindhuli Jail
 Sindhupalchowk Jail

Gandaki province
  Gorkha Jail
  Baglung Jail
  Kaski Jail
  Lamjung Jail
  Manang Jail
  Syangja Jail
 Tanahun Jail

Lumbini province
 Arghakhanchi Jail
  Ghorahi Jail
  Gulmi Jail
  Kapilvastu Jail
  Mustang Jail
  Myagdi Jail
  Nawalparasi Jail
  Palpa Jail
  Parbat Jail
 Rupandehi Jail
  Tulsipur Jail

Karnali Province
  Achham Jail
  Banke Jail
  Bardiya Jail
  Bajhang Jail
 Bajura Jail
  Dailekh Jail
  Doti Jail
 Jajarkot Jail
 Jumla Jail
  Kailali Jail
  Kalikot Jail
  Pyuthan Jail
 Rolpa Jail
 Rukum Jail
  Salyan Jail
 Surkhet Jail

Sudurpashchim Province
   Baitadi Jail
  Dadeldhura Jail
   Darchula Jail
   Dolpa Jail
  Humla Jail
  Kanchanpur Jail
  Mugu Jail

See also
List of foreign criminals in Nepal

References

Prisons in Nepal
Lists of prisons
prisons